The Shield and the Sword is a 1968 Soviet spy series in four parts directed by Vladimir Basov. It is based on a novel by Vadim Kozhevnikov, who was Secretary of the Soviet Writers' Union. It was highly influential in the Soviet Union, inspiring many, including Vladimir Putin, to join the KGB.

The song What Does Motherland Begin With (С чего начинается Родина), sung by Mark Bernes, that was main musical theme of each film in the series, became well known in the USSR.

Parts
 Part 1. No Right To Be Themselves (Без права быть собой)
 Part 2. The Order is: Survive (Приказано выжить)
 Part 3. Without Appeal (Обжалованию не подлежит)
 Part 4. The Last Frontier (Последний рубеж)

Plot
The year is 1940 and Nazi Germany is at the height of its military power, having captured most of Europe and eyeing the Soviet Union to the East. The Soviet military command suspects hostile intent from Germany and so arranges for its spies to infiltrate ranks of the German military and the SS. Alexander Belov (Lyubshin) is a Russian spy, who travels from Soviet-held Latvia to Nazi Germany under an alias of  Volksdeutsche Johann Weiss. His mastery of the German language, steel nerves and an ability to manipulate others help him to use his connections in the SS to ascend the ladder of the Abwehr and then in the SD. He uses his position to identify sympathetic Germans, who help him to procure vital intelligence, and to help local resistance movements in their collective fight against Nazism.

Cast
 Stanislav Lyubshin as Alexander Belov / Johann Weiss
 Oleg Yankovsky as Heinrich Schwarzkopf
 Georgy Martyniuk as Aleksey Zubov / Alois Hagen
 Vladimir Basov as Bruno
 Alla Demidova as Angelika Buecher
 Juozas Budraitis as Dietrich
 Aleksey Glazyrin as Steinglitz
 Valentina Titova as Nina
 Natalia Velichko as Elsa
 Vladimir Balashov as Sonnenberg
 Algimantas Masiulis as Willi Schwarzkopf
 Nikolai Zasukhin as Papke
 Lev Polyakov as Gerlach
 Nikolay Grabbe as Deaf-mute Man
 Yelena Dobronravova as Deaf-mute Woman
 Vatslav Dvorzhetsky as Lansdorf
 Anatoly Kubatsky as Franz
 Nikolay Prokopovich as Schulz
Kristina Lazar as Brigitte
 Valentin Smirnitsky as Andrey Basalyga / «Faza»
 Igor Bezyayev as  «Rabbit» 
 Vsevolod Safonov as  «Nail» 
 Vladimir Marenkov as  «Ace» 
 German Kachin as  «Cartilage»  
 Igor Yasulovich as  «Goga» 
 Radner Muratov as  «Shaman»  
 Konstantin Tyrtov as  «Tit» 
 Sergey Plotnikov as General Baryshev
 Inga Budkevich as Inga
 Uldis Dumpis as Luftwaffe Ace
 Helga Göring as Frau Dietmar
 Horst Preusker as Prof. Stutthoff
 Wojcech Duriasz as Jerzy Czyzewski
 Kurt-Mueller Reizner as Karl Kunert
 Silard Banki as Janos Molnar
 Vladimír Brabec as Jaromir Drobny
 Vladimir Osenev as Hitler
 Vyacheslav Dugin as Himmler
 Mikhail Sidorkin as Göring

References

External links 
 
 

1968 films
1960s spy films
Soviet spy films
World War II spy films
Films about Nazi Germany
Films directed by Vladimir Basov
Soviet World War II films
Russian World War II films
Films set in 1940
Films set in the Soviet Union
Films set in Latvia
Films about the Soviet Union in the Stalin era